The Civic Front of Córdoba, formerly known as the New Party against Corruption, for Honesty and Transparence is a provincial political party in Córdoba, Argentina.

Since 2015, Luis Juez reiterated his support for Mauricio Macri and Cambiemos, and rejected an agreement with Sergio Massa.

Currently, its representatives in Argentine Congress, Luis Juez and Ernesto Feliz Martínez, are part of the PRO bloc, within the Juntos por el Cambio inter-bloc.

References 

Provincial political parties in Argentina